Kanim Falls is the major waterfall on the North Fork of the Snoqualmie River. It is located at the outlet of Lake Kanim and is near the source of the North Fork of the Snoqualmie River. The falls were named after Chief Jerry Kanim who was the leader of Snoqualmie people.

See also
 Snoqualmie River

References

External links
 Cataloged Waterfalls in the Snoqualmie River Watershed

Waterfalls of King County, Washington
Waterfalls of Washington (state)